Lake Carmi State Park is a day-use state park near Enosburg Falls, Vermont in the United States. Located on Vermont Route 236, the park includes over two miles of frontage on the south and east shore of Lake Carmi.

Activities include camping, swimming, fishing, boating, hiking, nature programs, bicycling, picnicking, wildlife watching and winter sports.

Camping facilities include 140 tent/RV sites, 35 lean-to sites, 2 cabins, restrooms with running water and hot showers, and a trailer dump station. Other facilities include swimming beaches in each campground, a day use beach, canoe, kayak and rowboat rentals, and a boat launch.

There is a nature center, and park rangers offer interpretive programs including night hikes, campfire programs, amphibian explorations, and nature crafts and games.

The state has designated 140 acres as Lake Carmi Bog Natural Area.

References

External links
Official website

State parks of Vermont
Protected areas of Franklin County, Vermont
Enosburg, Vermont
Nature centers in Vermont
1959 establishments in Vermont